The following is a list of ecoregions in Indonesia. An ecoregion is defined by the WWF as a "large area of land or water that contains a geographically distinct assemblage of natural communities". There are terrestrial, freshwater, and marine ecoregions. Ecoregions classified into biomes or major habitat types.

Indonesia straddles two of the Earth's biogeographical realms, large-scale divisions of the Earth's surface based on the historic and evolutionary distribution patterns of plants and animals. Realms are subdivided into bioregions (and marine realms into provinces), which are in turn made up of multiple ecoregions. The Indomalayan realm extends across the western half of the archipelago, and the eastern half is in the Australasian realm. The Wallace Line, which runs between Borneo and Sulawesi, Bali and Lombok, is the dividing line.

The portion of Indonesia west of the Wallace Line is known as the Sundaland bioregion, which also includes Malaysia and Brunei. When sea levels fell during the ice ages, the shallow Sunda Shelf was exposed, linking the Islands of Sundaland to the Asian continent. Sundaland has many large mammals of Asian origin, including rhinoceros, Asian Elephant, and apes.

East of the Wallace Line lies the Wallacea bioregion, made up of islands that were never linked to a continent, but were instead pushed up by the Australian continent's northward movement. Wallacea is a transitional region between Asia and Australia. It has a flora of mostly Indomalayan origin, with elements from Australasia, with a reptile and bird fauna of mainly Australian origin and no large mammal fauna.

The Aru Islands and the Indonesian portion of New Guinea are connected by the shallow Sahul Shelf to the Australian continent, and were connected by land during the ice ages. New Guinea has a flora of chiefly Asian origin with many Australasian elements, and a fauna similar to that of Australia.

Terrestrial

Sundaland bioregion

Tropical and subtropical moist broadleaf forests

Borneo lowland rain forests (Borneo, Natuna Islands)
Borneo montane rain forests (Borneo)
Borneo peat swamp forests (Borneo)
Eastern Java–Bali montane rain forests (Bali, Java)
Eastern Java–Bali rain forests (Bali, Java)
Mentawai Islands rain forests (Mentawai Islands)
Peninsular Malaysian rain forests (Anambas Islands, Lingga Islands, Riau Archipelago)
Southwest Borneo freshwater swamp forests (Borneo)
Sumatran freshwater swamp forests (Sumatra)
Sumatran lowland rain forests (Sumatra, Nias, Bangka)
Sumatran montane rain forests (Sumatra)
Sumatran peat swamp forests (Sumatra)
Sundaland heath forests (Borneo, Bangka, Belitung)
Western Java montane rain forests (Java)
Western Java rain forests (Java)

Tropical and subtropical coniferous forests

Sumatran tropical pine forests (Sumatra)

Mangroves

Sunda Shelf mangroves (Borneo, Sumatra, Riau Islands)

Wallacea bioregion

Tropical and subtropical moist broadleaf forests

Banda Sea Islands moist deciduous forests (Kai Islands, Tanimbar Islands, Babar Islands, Leti Islands, eastern Barat Daya Islands)
Buru rain forests (Buru)
Halmahera rain forests (Halmahera, Morotai, Obi Islands, Bacan Island)
Seram rain forests (Seram, Banda Islands, Ambon Island, Saparua, Gorong Islands)
Sulawesi lowland rain forests (Sulawesi, Banggai Islands, Sula Islands, Sangihe Islands, Talaud Islands)
Sulawesi montane rain forests (Sulawesi)

Tropical and subtropical dry broadleaf forests

Lesser Sundas deciduous forests (Lombok, Sumbawa, Komodo, Flores, Alor)
Sumba deciduous forests (Sumba)
Timor and Wetar deciduous forests (Timor, Wetar)

New Guinea bioregion

Tropical and subtropical moist broadleaf forests

Biak–Numfoor rain forests
Central Range montane rain forests
Northern New Guinea lowland rain and freshwater swamp forests
Northern New Guinea montane rain forests
Southern New Guinea freshwater swamp forests
Southern New Guinea lowland rain forests
Vogelkop montane rain forests
Vogelkop–Aru lowland rain forests
Yapen rain forests

Tropical and subtropical grasslands, savannas, and shrublands

Trans-Fly savanna and grasslands

Montane grasslands and shrublands

Central Range sub-alpine grasslands

Mangrove

New Guinea mangroves

Freshwater

Sunda Shelf and the Philippines bioregion

Montane Freshwaters

Borneo Highlands

Tropical and Subtropical coastal rivers

Aceh
Central & Eastern Java
Eastern Borneo
Indian Ocean Slope of Sumatra & Java
Kapuas
Malay Peninsula Eastern Slope
Northeastern Borneo
Northern Central Sumatra - Western Malaysia
Northern Philippine Islands
Northwestern Borneo
Southeastern Borneo
Southern Central Sumatra
Southern Sumatra - Western Java

Wallacea bioregion

Montane Freshwaters

Lake Poso
Matano - Southern Malili Lakes

Tropical and subtropical coastal rivers

Lesser Sunda Islands
Maluku; (Indonesia)
Sulawesi

New Guinea bioregion

Montane Freshwaters

New Guinea Central Mountains
New Guinea North Coast

Tropical and subtropical coastal rivers

Southwest New Guinea - Trans-Fly Lowland
Vogelkop - Bomberai

Marine

Western Indo-Pacific

Andaman

Western Sumatra

Central Indo-Pacific

Sunda Shelf

Sunda Shelf/Java Sea
Malacca Strait

Java Transitional

Southern Java

Western Coral Triangle

Palawan/North Borneo
Sulawesi Sea/Makassar Strait
Halmahera
Papua
Banda Sea
Lesser Sunda
Northeast Sulawesi

Sahul Shelf

Arafura Sea

References
 Wikramanayake, Eric; Eric Dinerstein; Colby J. Loucks; et al. (2002). Terrestrial Ecoregions of the Indo-Pacific: a Conservation Assessment. Island Press; Washington, DC.
 Freshwater Ecoregions of the World
 Abell, R., Michele L. Thieme, Carmen Revenga, Mark Bryer et al. "Freshwater Ecoregions of the World: A New Map of Biogeographic Units for Freshwater Biodiversity Conservation". Bioscience Vol. 58 No. 5, May 2008, pp. 403-414.
 Spalding, Mark D., Helen E. Fox, Gerald R. Allen, Nick Davidson et al. "Marine Ecoregions of the World: A Bioregionalization of Coastal and Shelf Areas". Bioscience Vol. 57 No. 7, July/August 2007, pp. 573–583.

 

Indonesia
Ecoregions